Thomas Hagmann (born 11 October 1953) is a Swiss judoka. He competed at the 1976 Summer Olympics and the 1980 Summer Olympics.

References

1953 births
Living people
Swiss male judoka
Olympic judoka of Switzerland
Judoka at the 1976 Summer Olympics
Judoka at the 1980 Summer Olympics
Place of birth missing (living people)
20th-century Swiss people